The 1971 Cal Poly Mustangs football team represented California Polytechnic State College—now known as California Polytechnic State University, San Luis Obispo—as a member of the California Collegiate Athletic Association (CCAA) during the 1971 NCAA College Division football season. Led by fourth-year head coach Joe Harper, Cal Poly compiled an overall record of 6–5 with a mark of 3–0 in conference play, winning the CCAA title for the third consecutive season. The Mustangs played home games at Mustang Stadium in San Luis Obispo, California.

Schedule

Team players in the NFL
The following Cal Poly Mustangs were selected in the 1972 NFL Draft.

References

Cal Poly
Cal Poly Mustangs football seasons
California Collegiate Athletic Association football champion seasons
Cal Poly Mustangs football